Serjius (real name Serge Jacques Léon Halpryn) (22 November 1878 – 26 October 1966) was a French stage and film actor.

Filmography 

 1932: L'affaire de la rue de Lourcine by Marcel Dumont 
 1932: The Crowd Roars by Howard Hawks and Jean Daumery as Spud
 1932: The Three Musketeers by Henri Diamant-Berger as Mousqueton
 1933: Miquette by Henri Diamant-Berger as the impresario
 1934: Laquelle des deux ? by Pierre Miquel – short film – as Le chef de gare
 1935: Une demi-heure en correctionnelle by Henri Diamant-Berger – short film –
 1935: La Grande vie  by Henri Diamant-Berger – short film –
 1935: Bout de chou by Henry Wulschleger
 1935: Coup de vent by Jean Dréville and Giovacchino Forzano
 1935: Debout là-dedans ! by Henri Wulschleger
 1935: Son Excellence Antonin by Charles-Félix Tavano
 1936: 27 Rue de la Paix by Richard Pottier
 1936: La Tentation by Pierre Caron – Philippe de Bergue
 1936: A Hen on a Wall by Maurice Gleize as Gustave
 1937: Arsene Lupin, Detective by Henri Diamant-Berger as Joseph
 1937: The West by Henri Fescourt
 1937: La Tour de Nesle by Gaston Roudès as Jehan
 1938: Vacances payées by Maurice Cammage as a gangster
 1939:  The Porter from Maxim's by Maurice Cammage
 1939: The Five Cents of Lavarede by Maurice Cammage as a warden

Theatre 
 1940: Le Bossu by Paul Féval and Auguste Anicet-Bourgeois, directed by Robert Ancelin, Théâtre de la Porte-Saint-Martin
 1941: Le Maître de forges by Georges Ohnet, directed by Robert Ancelin, Théâtre de la Porte-Saint-Martin
 1941: Les Deux Orphelines by Adolphe d'Ennery and Eugène Cormon, directed by Robert Ancelin, Théâtre de la Porte-Saint-Martin
 1941: Les Deux Gosses by Pierre Decourcelle, directed by Robert Ancelin, Théâtre de la Porte-Saint-Martin
 1942: Occupe-toi d'Amélie! by Georges Feydeau, directed by Robert Ancelin, Théâtre de la Porte-Saint-Martin

External links 
 

French male stage actors
French male film actors
Male actors from Paris
1878 births
1966 deaths